Heosphora minimella is a species of moth in the family Pyralidae. The species was first described by George Hampson in 1901. It is found in Australia.

References 

Pyralidae
Moths of Australia
Moths described in 1901